Katherine Anne Whittred is a Canadian retired politician.  She was a BC Liberal Member of the Legislative Assembly of British Columbia, from 1996 to 2009, representing the riding of North Vancouver-Lonsdale.

Whittred was first elected in 1996, defeating NDP Cabinet Minister and well known political commentator David Schreck.  She served as chair of the Liberal caucus while in opposition, and served in the cabinet of Gordon Campbell from 2001 to 2004 as Minister of State for Intermediate, Long Term and Home Care.  Whittred was appointed Deputy Speaker on November 6, 2007.

In March 2006, Whittred introduced a Motion in the Legislature to abolish the practice of mandatory retirement. In May 2007, Bill 31 was passed, which amended the Human Rights Code to eliminate mandatory retirement based on age.

Whittred studied at the University of Calgary where she obtained a Bachelor of Education degree. Before her election to the Legislative Assembly, she worked as a secondary school teacher with the Burnaby School District.

External links
Katherine Whittred

British Columbia Liberal Party MLAs
Women government ministers of Canada
Members of the Executive Council of British Columbia
Women MLAs in British Columbia
Year of birth missing (living people)
Living people
21st-century Canadian politicians
21st-century Canadian women politicians